Gaft is a village in Dasturan Rural District, in the Central District of Joghatai County, Razavi Khorasan Province, Iran. At the 2006 census, its population was 594, in 156 families.

References 

Populated places in Joghatai County